Willem F. H. Adelaar (born 1948 at The Hague) is a Dutch linguist specializing in Native American languages, specially those of the Andes. He is Professor of indigenous American Linguistics and Cultures at Leiden University.

He has written broadly about the Quechua, Aymara and Mapuche languages. His main works are his 2004 The languages of the Andes, an overview of the indigenous languages of the Andean region, which is considered a "classic" in the field. His Dutch language publications about the history and religion of the Inca and translations of Quechua chronicles have met with a broad public. A specialist on minority languages and language endangerment, he is also editor of UNESCO's "Interactive Atlas of the World's Languages in Danger".

In 1994 he was given a newly created Professorial chair in "Languages and Cultures of Native America" at the University of Leiden. He is noted for his belief that the linguistic diversity of the Americas suggests a deeper history of population than the standard account of the settlement of the Americas.

In 2014 he was made Knight of the Order of the Netherlands Lion in recognition of his scientific achievements. He also holds an honorary doctorate at the Universidad Nacional Mayor de San Marcos of Lima, Peru. In 2019 he was elected a member of Academia Europaea.

Selected publications
2009 Unesco Interactive Atlas of the World's Languages in Danger. (regional editor for South America). Paris: UNESCO.
2007 The Languages of the Andes. With the collaboration of P.C. Muysken. Cambridge language survey. Cambridge University Press. Revised edition. 
2007 The importance of toponymy, family names and historical documentation for the study of disappearing and recently extinct languages in the Andean region. In: L. Wetzels (ed.), Language Endangerment and Endangered Languages. Linguistic and anthropological studies with special emphasis on the languages and cultures of the Andean-Amazonian border area, pp. 325–331. Leiden: CNWS.
2007 Ensayo de clasificación del katawixí dentro del conjunto harakmbut-katukina. In: A. Romero Figueroa, A. Fernández Garay and A. Corbera Mori (eds.), Lenguas indígenas de América del Sur: Estudios descriptivo-tipológicos y sus contribuciones para la lingüística teórica, pp. 159–169. Caracas: Universidad Católica Andrés Bello.
2006 The Quechua impact in the Amuesha language, an Arawak language of the Peruvian Amazon. In: A.Y. Aikhenvald & R.M.W. Dixon (eds.), Grammars in Contact. A Cross-Linguistic Typology, pp. 290–312. Oxford and New York: Oxford University Press
1995 Raíces lingüísticas del Quichua de Santiago del Estero. In: A. Fernández Garay & J.P. Viegas Barros (eds.), Actas de las Segundas Jornadas de Lingüística Aborigen, pp. 25–50. Universidad de Buenos Aires.
1994 La procedencia dialectal del manuscrito de Huarochirí en base a sus características lingüísticas. Revista Andina, 12:1, pp. 137–154. Cusco: Centro "Bartolomé de Las Casas".
1987 Morfología del quechua de Pacaraos. Lima: Universidad Nacional Mayor de San Marcos.
1987 Aymarismos en el quechua de Puno. Indiana, 11, pp. 223‑231. Berlin: Gebr. Mann Verlag. 
1982 Léxico del quechua de Pacaraos. Lima: Universidad Nacional Mayor de San Marcos: Centro de Investigación de Linguística Aplicada: Documento de Trabajo No. 45.

References

External links
Languages of the Andes Electronic book of Languages of the Andes. Cambridge Books Online.
MA Indian American Studies Programme Director of Indian American Studies
Leiden University Centre for Linguistics Homepage at University Leiden

1948 births
Living people
Linguists from the Netherlands
Scientists from The Hague
University of Amsterdam alumni
Academic staff of Leiden University
Paleolinguists
Linguists of Aymaran languages
Linguists of Quechuan languages
Linguists of indigenous languages of South America
Members of Academia Europaea